The Slate River is located in the northwest of the South Island of New Zealand. It is a tributary of the Aorere River.

Rivers of the Tasman District
Rivers of New Zealand